Ona (Aona), also known as Selk'nam (Shelknam), is a language that is spoken by the Selk'nam people in Isla Grande de Tierra del Fuego in southernmost South America.

Part of the Chonan languages of Patagonia, Selk'nam is almost extinct, due both to the late 19th-century Selk'nam genocide by European immigrants, high fatalities due to disease and disruption of traditional society. One source states that the last fluent native speakers died in the 1980s, A Radboud University linguist worked with speaker Herminia Vera-Ona, who died in 2014, to write a reference grammar of the language.

Classification 
Within the Southern Chon language family, Selk'nam is closest to Haush, another language spoken on the island of Tierra del Fuego.

There is speculation that Chon together with the Moseten languages, a small group of languages in Bolivia, form part of a Moseten-Chonan language family. Another proposal is, that it is related to the Pano-Tacanan languages.

Joseph Greenberg classifies Selk'nan as an Amerind language of the Southern Andinan group.

History
The Selk'nam people, also known as the 'Ona, are an indigenous people who inhabited the northeastern part of the archipelago of Tierra del Fuego for thousands of years before Europeans arrived. They were nomads known as "foot-people," as they did their hunting on land, rather than being seafarers.

The last full-blooded Selk'nam, Ángela Loij, died in 1974. They were one of the last aboriginal groups in South America to be reached by Europeans. Their language, believed to be part of the Chonan family, is considered extinct as the last native speakers died in the 1980s. Currently, Selk'nam communities are revitalizing the language. A man of mixed Selk'nam and Mapuche ancestry, Joubert Yanten Gomez (indigenous name: Keyuk) has successfully taught himself the language.

Phonology 
Based on available data, Selk'nam seems to have had 3 vowels and 23 consonants.

Selk'nam has three vowels: .

Grammar
The Ona language is an object–verb–subject language (OVS), this is a rare word order (only 1% of languages use it as their default word order). There are only two word classes in Selk'nam: nouns and verbs.

See also 
 List of endangered languages
 Languages of Argentina
 Languages of Chile

References

External links 
Guillermo Latorre, Sustrato y superestrato multilingües en la toponimia del extremo sur de Chile, Facultad de Filosofía y Humanidades de la Universidad Austral de Chile
WALS
Selk'nam dictionary online (select simple or advanced browsing).
Selknam (Intercontinental Dictionary Series)

Chonan languages
Extinct languages of South America
Fuegian languages
Object–verb–subject languages
Selk'nam people
Languages of Argentina
Languages of Chile